"Coming Over" is a 2016 single by American electronic music producer Dillon Francis and Norwegian DJ and record producer Kygo, featuring vocals by Austrian singer James Hersey. The track is taken from Dillon Francis' 2015 EP set This Mixtape Is Fire. The single is the first number-one for all three artists involved on Billboards Dance Club Songs chart, reaching the top spot in its June 11, 2016 issue. The song is actually a sampled recording using multiple elements of the original version of James Hersey's "Coming Over," which he recorded in 2014.

Track listing
From iTunes

Charts

Weekly charts

Year-end charts

Certifications

References

2016 singles
2016 songs
Dillon Francis songs
Kygo songs
Columbia Records singles
Song recordings produced by Dillon Francis
Song recordings produced by Kygo
Songs written by Dillon Francis
Songs written by Kygo